Jerko Granic is a Croatian retired footballer who played in the Yugoslav First League, Yugoslav Second League, and the National Soccer League.

Club career 
Granic began playing football at the junior level with Hajduk Split, and went professional with Hajduk in 1959. After three seasons with Hajduk he signed with NK Karlovac in the Yugoslav Second League. In 1970, he went abroad to play in the National Soccer League with Toronto Croatia, he won the NSL Championship in 1971. He later was signed by Toronto Metros-Croatia in the North American Soccer League in 1975.

References 

Year of birth missing (living people)
Living people
Footballers from Zagreb
Yugoslav footballers
Association football midfielders
HNK Hajduk Split players
NK Karlovac players
Toronto Croatia players
Yugoslav First League players
Canadian National Soccer League players
Yugoslav expatriate footballers
Expatriate soccer players in Canada
Yugoslav expatriate sportspeople in Canada